Walter De Raffaele (born October 31, 1968) is an Italian professional basketball coach and former player. De Raffaele has coached multiple teams in Italy since 2000.

Coaching career
In June 2016, De Raffaele signed a contract as head coach of Umana Reyer Venezia. On May 2, 2018, De Raffaele won the FIBA Europe Cup with Reyer.

References

1968 births
Living people
FIBA Europe Cup-winning coaches
Italian basketball coaches
Italian men's basketball players
Libertas Liburnia Basket Livorno players
Olimpia Basket Pistoia players
Pallacanestro Petrarca Padova players
Point guards
Reyer Venezia coaches
Scaligera Basket Verona coaches
Sportspeople from Livorno